Zbojštica (Serbian Cyrillic: Збојштица) is a village located in the Užice municipality of Serbia. In the 2002 census, the village had a population of 172.

Užice
Populated places in Zlatibor District